Potato Hill (also known as Spud Hill) is a summit in Latah County, Idaho, in the United States.

Potato Hill is volcanic in origin.

References

Mountains of Latah County, Idaho
Mountains of Idaho